The Pizzas d'Anarosa (or Grauhörner) is a mountain of the Swiss Lepontine Alps, located north of Splügen in the canton of Graubünden. It lies between the Safiental and the Hinterrhein valley. The mountain has several summits, the main summit having a height of 3,002 metres.

References

External links
 Pizzas d'anarosa on Hikr

Mountains of the Alps
Alpine three-thousanders
Mountains of Graubünden
Lepontine Alps
Mountains of Switzerland
Safiental